Heritage High School is a public high school located in Lynchburg, Virginia.
The school is a part of Lynchburg City Public Schools District. Timothy Beatty is the head principal . Heritage has enrollment of 1102 as of 2011. Its mascot is the Pioneer and its colors are Navy Blue and Orange.

Because of structural issues, the existing school building was demolished in 2016 and the new Heritage High School campus was completed.

History
In January, 1975, a steering committee, representative of educators, 
students, parents, and the community at large, was appointed to begin planning a new high school to accommodate approximately 2,000 students. This committee and twenty-three subcommittees worked under the able direction of Dr. Ernest Martin, Special Assistant to the Superintendent, to draw up the initial specifications for the new school. From this planning merged the architects' design of an ultra-modern structure, beautiful in appearance and functional in use.

The new school had no real identity until the spring of 1976, when a special School Board committee, chaired by Mr. James K. Candler, made the following announcement: "We propose Heritage High School as a fitting name for the city's newest secondary building. The name shall serve to remind this generation and generations to come that the first responsibility in public education is to see that our democratic way of life is preserved through an informed electorate. This name shall call to mind both the pride in achievements in the past and shall hold forth a challenge for greater progress in the future. It shall provide a continuing reminder to Lynchburg educators and citizens of the obligation which is theirs - to mold the future through the education of the youth - to carry on the heritage of free education first established in the city of Lynchburg in 1871 and in the Colony of Virginia in 1634.

The building suffered many structural problems that resulted in the need for higher maintenance costs than comparable schools. In 2007, the Lynchburg School Board hired a firm to suggest ways to either renovate the building, merge the school population to E.C. Glass, or replace it. A task force urged replacement in a September 2011 report.
In March 2014, the Lynchburg City Council approved a $63.4 million bid from Barton Malow to build the new school in time for the beginning of the 2016 school year.

The School 
First Floor- Cafeteria, Auditorium, Band, Chorus, Orchestra, Drama, Art Hall, Clinic, Main Office, Gymnasium, History Hall, Foreign Language Hall, Library (first floor), Driver's Education and Health
Second Floor- Cosmetology, English Hall, Math Hall, Science Hall, Library (second floor)

Facts 
Heritage High School was built to produce solar energy hence its unique architecture 
Heritage is one of three high schools in Virginia to have an indoor track on their campus (Ralph D. Spencer Memorial Fieldhouse) on the 2nd Floor

Notable alumni
Leland D. Melvin (NASA engineer and astronaut)
Paris Lenon (former NFL Linebacker)
Keith Hamilton (former NFL Lineman)
Chris Cook (NFL Cornerback-last play with the San Francisco 49ers)
Chris Parker (former NFL running back)
Kevin Keatts, head coach for NC State Wolfpack men's basketball, former head coach for UNC Wilmington.

Central Virginia Governor's School 
Heritage High School is home to the Central Virginia Governor's School for Science and Technology. Gifted high school students from Amherst, Appomattox, Bedford, and Campbell counties as well as Lynchburg City attend classes at a separate location within the high school.

Marine Corps JROTC 
Heritage High School has a Marine Corps JROTC. In addition to academic subjects, extracurricular activities include Drill team, Rifle team, Cyber team, and Raider Team.

Athletics 
Heritage (Lynchburg) has won a number of VHSL Seminole District, Region III, and State Championships at the AAA and AA level.

State Championships 
Recent Champions*

2002 
Virginia State AA Division 4 Football Champions
Lafayette High School-Williamsburg - 7  vs Heritage High School - 34
Virginia State AA Indoor Track Champions (Boys)

2003
Virginia State AA Indoor Track Champions (Boys)
Virginia State AA Indoor Track Runner-Up (Girls)
Virginia State AA Outdoor Track Champions (Girls)
Virginia State AA Outdoor Track Champions (Boys)

2004 
Virginia State AA Basketball Final Four Tournament (Boys)

2005
Virginia State AA Baseball Final Four

2006
Virginia State AA Indoor Track Champions (Boys)

2018
Virginia State Class AAA STATE FOOTBALL CHAMPIONS 
Heritage 24, Phoebus 20
Williams Stadium (Lynchburg, VA)

2019
Virginia State AA Outdoor Track Champions (Girls)

Regionals 
1978
Northwest Region AAA Baseball Champions

1997
Division 4, Region 3 Football Champions
-Heritage 20, Salem 14

2002 
Division 4,Region 3 Football Champions
- Heritage 28,Blacksburg 10

2003
Region III Outdoor Track Champions (Girls)
Region III Outdoor Track Champions (Boys)
Region III Indoor Track Champions (Girls)
Region III Indoor Track Champions (Boys)

2004
Region III Indoor Track Champions (Girls)

2005
Region III Indoor Track Champions (Boys)
Region III Baseball Champions (Dream Team) 
Scott Stevens, D.W Moore, Terrance Penn, Michael Costa, Aaron Reid, Jeffery Taylor, Cameron Grant, Jared Blakenship, Mike Howell, LA Robertson, Leland Heritige, Josh Owens, Brett Hass, Derick Wathall,

2006
Region III Indoor Track Champions (Boys)

2007
ACE Team (The VHSL calls it Scholastic Bowl)

2008
Region III Indoor Track Champions (Boys)

2012
Division 4, Region 3 Football Champions
-Heritage 12, Amherst County 7

2017
Class AAA, Region C Football Champions
— Heritage 62, Brookville 20

2018
Class AAA, Region C Football Champions
-Heritage 44, Liberty (Bed) 28

2019
Class AAA, Region C Football Champions 
-Heritage 43, Spotswood 20

Theater 
Heritage High School is also home to Pioneer Theatre. A student run program with Theatre Director Larry Hart and Associate Director Michelle Velastegui as of Fall 2008. In 2010, the Virginia Theatre Association named Director Larry Hart theatre educator of the year. All sets are built by Applied Technical Theater I & II. The theatre produces around six shows a year. The six plays usually consist of an Acting II Competition Piece, a Theater in the round, a Mainstage Straight Play, a Mainstage Musical, an Acting II Musical or "Straight Play" Dinner Theatre, and the Acting II Original One Acts.  While this is the current compilation it does change slightly from year to year.

2006-2007 season 

Urinetown
Murder of One
House of Blue Leaves
Beauty and the Beast
Snoopy, The Musical
Acting II presents Original One-Acts

2007-2008 season 

Singin' in the Rain
When the Angels Cried and the Mountains Fell
Its a Wonderful Life
Evita
Suburb, The Musical
Acting II presents Original One-Acts

2008-2009 season 

Fahrenheit 451
Paparazzo,a Morality Play in the Guise of a Musical Fantasy
Noises Off
The Producers
Charlotte's Web
Acting II presents Original One-Acts

2009-2010 season 

Once on This Island
You Don't Know Jack
Running in the Red
Peter Pan
The Foreigner
Acting II presents Original One-Acts

2010-2011 season 

The Wedding Singer
The Human Condition
Lend Me a Tenor
The Wizard of Oz
Acting II presents Original One-Acts

2011-2012 season 

The Drowsy Chaperone
Fire
See How They Run
Hairspray
Little Shop of Horrors
Acting II presents Original One-Acts

2012-2013 season 

The Art of the Bully
Footloose
A Raisin in the Sun
The Dining Room
The Adding Machine
Acting II presents Original One-Acts

2013-2014 season 

Chicago
A Christmas Story
When the Angels Cried and the Mountains Fell
Shrek: The Musical
Mr. Beiderman and the Firebugs
Acting II presents Original One-Acts

2014-2015 season 

 Night of the Living Dead: Live!
 Murder Americana: The Trial of Lizzie Borden
 Wait Until Dark
 The Addams Family
 Black Comedy
 Oh Dad, Poor Dad, Momma's Hung You In the Closet and I'm Feelin' So Sad
 Acting II presents Original One-Acts

2015-2016 season 

 Moon Over Buffalo
 The Lost Boy
 Ragtime: The Musical
 Almost, Maine
 Shakespeare's R&J
 Acting II presents Original One-Acts

2016-2017 season 

 To Kill a Mockingbird
 Fire: Prometheus On Trial
 It's A Wonderful Life
 Beauty and The Beast
 All in the Timing
 Talley's Folly
 Acting II Presents Original One-Acts

2017-2018 season 

 Noises Off
 Second Samuel
 The Cover of Life
 Les Misérables
 Loving
 The Crucible
 Acting II Presents Original One-Acts

References

External links 
 Heritage High School
 Central Virginia Governor's School for Science and Technology
 Lynchburg City Schools
 VHSL-Reference website
 Leland D. Melvin
 

Public high schools in Virginia
Schools in Lynchburg, Virginia
1976 establishments in Virginia